Hykeem Jamaal Carter Jr. (born October 22, 2000), known professionally as Baby Keem, is an American rapper and record producer. He initially gained major recognition following the release of his single "Orange Soda", from his second mixtape Die for My Bitch (2019). He would later collaborate with Kanye West on the song "Praise God", which reached the top 20 on the US Billboard Hot 100 chart and was certified Platinum in April 2022.

His debut studio album The Melodic Blue, was released in September 2021 by pgLang and Columbia Records. The album debuted at number five on the Billboard 200 chart. The single "Family Ties" with his cousin Kendrick Lamar became his second top 20 on the Billboard Hot 100 and received the Grammy Award for Best Rap Performance. The album also included the songs "Durag Activity" alongside Travis Scott, and "Range Brothers" with Lamar.

Early life 
He was born in Carson, California. Prior to beginning his rapping career, Hykeem spent his early life (as early as 4 years old) in music studios watching his Aunts & Uncles "burn" CD's using the famous platform LimeWire, which was the most common source of free music listening back in the early 2000's. Just a few years later, he shared his memories of hearing Kanye West's album "808s & Heartbreak" on the radio while living in Las Vegas during the winter of 2009. This sparked his interest for music even more, which spurred his music research the following year. Keem looked up to artists such as Ye, Kid Cudi, Lil Wayne, Eminem, 50 Cent, along with others.

Keem became a small, yet prominent YouTuber who was involved in the Minecraft Survival Games mini-game scene during the early 2010's. Keem's Minecraft account was under the in game name "hykeemc" and his YouTube account went by the alias "AllMightyModz". Keem was known for being a highly skilled player on The Hive and MCGamer Network servers, amassing more than 1,000 subscribers on his YouTube channel because of his prowess. Keem would frequently hold Skype calls where his fans could play along with him. Today, Keem's channel is inactive, however, the links on his channel direct you to Keem's current SoundCloud account.

It wasn't until 2014 that Hykeem decided to start pursuing his own musical career.

Musical career
Keem has both songwriting and production credits on his cousin Kendrick Lamar's project, Black Panther: The Album, TDE member Jay Rock's Redemption, Schoolboy Q's Crash Talk, and the song "Nile" from Disney's The Lion King: The Gift. Keem worked with record producer Cardo, on his two mixtapes, The Sound of a Bad Habit (2018) and Die for My Bitch (2019).

In March 2020, Keem was featured in the visual mission statement for Kendrick Lamar and Dave Free's company, pgLang. In August 2020, it was revealed Baby Keem was included on XXLs 2020 Freshman Class.

On September 18, 2020, Keem returned with the release of two new songs, "Hooligan", and "Sons & Critics Freestyle". He then released "No Sense", on March 5, 2021. On April 30, Keem released "Durag Activity" with Travis Scott. The song was followed by another collaboration with Keem's cousin Kendrick Lamar, titled "Family Ties", which was released on August 27, 2021. These songs are featured on Keem's debut studio album The Melodic Blue, which was released on September 10, 2021. The album also included the single "Issues", which Keem performed on The Tonight Show Starring Jimmy Fallon, a collaboration with Don Toliver titled "Cocoa", as well as previously teased tracks "Vent" and "Range Brothers". Keem also made an appearance on Kanye West's tenth studio album Donda, on the song "Praise God", alongside Travis Scott.

On April 3, 2022, Keem won a Grammy for Best Rap Performance for "Family Ties", along with Kendrick Lamar.

On October 28, 2022, Keem released the deluxe edition of The Melodic Blue.

Artistry

Influences
In a 2019 interview, Keem cited American musician Kid Cudi, as a major influence: "I was inspired by Cudi's cadences and shit like that. Kid Cudi's one of my favorite artists."

In a 2021 interview with Billboard, Keem reportedly identified as part of the Mike WiLL Made-It and Metro Boomin generation, saying he derives inspiration from the two producers, as well as from Kanye West.

Discography

Studio albums

Mixtapes

EPs

Singles

Other charted songs

Guest appearances

Music videos

Tours

Headlining

 Die For My Bitch Tour (2019)
 The Melodic Blue Tour (2021-2022)

Supporting
 Kendrick Lamar - The Big Steppers Tour (2022)

Production credits

2018 
Various artists - Black Panther: The Album
10. "Redemption Interlude" (performed by Zacari) (additional production)
Jay Rock - Redemption
03. "Knock It Off"
05. "Rotation 112th"

2019 
ScHoolboy Q - CrasH Talk
04. "Numb Numb Juice" (additional production)
06. "Lies" (featuring Ty Dolla $ign and YG) (additional production)
Various artists - The Lion King: The Gift
10. "NILE" (performed by Beyoncé and Kendrick Lamar) (additional production)

2022 
Offset - Blame it on Set
 "54321"

Awards and nominations 
Grammy Awards
! 
|-
! scope="row" rowspan="4"| 2022
| Himself
| Best New Artist
| 
| rowspan="4"|
|-
| Donda (as featured artist)
| Album of the Year
| 
|-
| rowspan="2"|"Family Ties"
| Best Rap Performance
| 
|-
|  Best Rap Song
| 
|}
BET Awards
! 
|-
! scope="row" rowspan="7"| 2022
| rowspan="2"| "Family Ties"
| Video of the Year
| 
| rowspan="7"| 
|-
| Best Collaboration
| 
|-
| Himself
| Best New Artist
| 
|}
Billboard Music Awards
! 
|-
! scope="row" rowspan="4"| 2022
| "Praise God"
| Top Gospel Song
| 
| rowspan="4"|
|-
| "Praise God"
| Top Christian Song
| 
|}
NME Awards
! 
|-
! scope="row" rowspan="3"| 2022
| "Family Ties"
| Best Collaboration
| 
| rowspan="3"| 
|}
XXL Awards
! 
|-
! scope="row" rowspan="4"| 2022
| rowspan="2"| "Family Ties"
| Song of the Year
| 
| rowspan="4"|
|-
| Video of the Year
| 
|}

Notes

References

Living people
21st-century American rappers
American hip hop record producers
Rappers from Nevada
West Coast hip hop musicians
2000 births
American hip hop singers
African-American male singer-songwriters
African-American male rappers
African-American record producers
21st-century African-American male singers
Singer-songwriters from Nevada
Grammy Award winners for rap music
Trap musicians
Alternative hip hop musicians
PGLang artists
People from Carson, California